In mathematics, specifically in group theory, the concept of a semidirect product is a generalization of a direct product. There are two closely related concepts of semidirect product: 
 an inner semidirect product is a particular way in which a group can be made up of two subgroups, one of which is a normal subgroup. 
 an outer semidirect product is a way to construct a new group from two given groups by using the Cartesian product as a set and a particular multiplication operation. 
As with direct products, there is a natural equivalence between inner and outer semidirect products, and both are commonly referred to simply as semidirect products.

For finite groups, the Schur–Zassenhaus theorem provides a sufficient condition for the existence of a decomposition as a semidirect product (also known as  splitting extension).

Inner semidirect product definitions 

Given a group  with identity element , a subgroup , and a normal subgroup , the following statements are equivalent:
  is the product of subgroups, and these subgroups have trivial intersection: .
 For every , there are unique  and  such that .
 For every , there are unique  and  such that .
In other words, there is a split exact sequence
 

 

 or  

To avoid ambiguity, it is advisable to specify which is the normal subgroup.

Inner and outer semidirect products 

Let us first consider the inner semidirect product. In this case, for a group , consider its normal subgroup   and the subgroup  (not necessarily normal). Assume that the
conditions on the list above hold. Construct a group homomorphism   defined by conjugation, 
In this way we can construct a group  with group operation defined as 
The subgroups  and  determine  up to isomorphism, as we will show later. In this way, we can construct the group  from its subgroups. This kind of construction is called an inner semidirect product (also known as internal semidirect product).

Let us now consider the outer semidirect product.

The full group is a semidirect product of those two subgroups in the sense given earlier.

Let  be the homomorphism (written ) given by

for all .

Then  is isomorphic to the semidirect product . The isomorphism  is well defined
by  due to the uniqueness of the decomposition .

In , we have 

which proves that  is a homomorphism. Since  is obviously an epimorphism and monomorphism, then it is indeed an isomorphism.

The direct product is a special case of the semidirect product.

A version of the splitting lemma for groups states that a group  is isomorphic to a semidirect product of the two groups  and  if and only if there exists a short exact sequence

Examples

Dihedral group 
The presentation for this group is:

Cyclic groups 

gives a group isomorphic to the previous one.

Holomorph of a group 
One canonical example of a group expressed as a semi-direct product is the holomorph of a group. In terms of multiplying elements, this gives the group structure

Fundamental group of the Klein bottle 
The fundamental group of the Klein bottle can be presented in the form

Upper triangular matrices 
The group  of upper triangular matrices with non-zero determinant, that is with non-zero entries on the diagonal, has a decomposition into the semidirect product
If we set

and 

then their matrix product is

This gives the induced group action 

Hence .

Group of isometries on the plane 
Applying a translation and then a rotation or reflection has the same effect as applying the rotation or reflection first and then a translation by the rotated or reflected translation vector (i.e. applying the conjugate of the original translation).

Orthogonal group O(n) 
In the non-trivial case ( is not the identity) this means that  is conjugation of operations by the reflection (in 3-dimensional space a rotation axis and the direction of rotation are replaced by their "mirror image").

Semi-linear transformations 

Crystallographic groups 
In crystallography, the space group of a crystal splits as the semidirect product of the point group and the translation group if and only if the space group is symmorphic. Non-symmorphic space groups have point groups that are not even contained as subset of the space group, which is responsible for much of the complication in their analysis.

Non-examples 
Of course, no simple group can be expressed as a semi-direct product (because they do not have nontrivial normal subgroups), but there are a few common counterexamples of groups containing a non-trivial normal subgroup that nonetheless cannot be expressed as a semi-direct product.

Z4 

Q8 
This would mean  would have to be a split extension in the following hypothetical exact sequence of groups: , but such an exact sequence does not exist.

Properties 

Relation to direct products 
Suppose  is a semidirect product of the normal subgroup  and the subgroup .

This is not the case for semidirect products, as the two factors play different roles.

Furthermore, the result of a (proper) semidirect product by means of a non-trivial homomorphism is never an abelian group, even if the factor groups are abelian.

Non-uniqueness of semidirect products (and further examples) 

One of these four semidirect products is the direct product, while the other three are non-abelian groups:
 the dihedral group of order 16
 the quasidihedral group of order 16
 the Iwasawa group of order 16

If a given group is a semidirect product, then there is no guarantee that this decomposition is unique. For example, there is a group of order 24 (the only one containing six elements of order 4 and six elements of order 6) that can be expressed as semidirect product in the following ways: .

Existence 

In general, there is no known characterization (i.e., a necessary and sufficient condition) for the existence of semidirect products in groups. However, some sufficient conditions are known, which guarantee existence in certain cases. For finite groups, the Schur–Zassenhaus theorem guarantees existence of a semidirect product when the order of the normal subgroup is coprime to the order of the quotient group.

For example, the Schur–Zassenhaus theorem implies the existence of a semi-direct product among groups of order 6; there are two such products, one of which is a direct product, and the other a dihedral group. In contrast, the Schur–Zassenhaus theorem does not say anything about groups of order 4 or groups of order 8 for instance.

Generalizations 

Within group theory, the construction of semidirect products can be pushed much further. The Zappa–Szep product of groups is a generalization that, in its internal version, does not assume that either subgroup is normal. 

There is also a construction in ring theory, the crossed product of rings.  This is constructed in the natural way from the group ring for a semidirect product of groups.  The ring-theoretic approach can be further generalized to the semidirect sum of Lie algebras.  

For geometry, there is also a crossed product for group actions on a topological space; unfortunately, it is in general non-commutative even if the group is abelian.  In this context, the semidirect product is the space of orbits of the group action.  The latter approach has been championed by Alain Connes as a substitute for approaches by conventional topological techniques; c.f. noncommutative geometry.  

There are also far-reaching generalisations in category theory. They show how to construct fibred categories from indexed categories. This is an abstract form of the outer semidirect product construction.

Groupoids 

Another generalization is for groupoids. This occurs in topology because if a group  acts on a space  it also acts on the fundamental groupoid  of the space.  The semidirect product  is then relevant to finding the fundamental groupoid of the orbit space . For full  details see Chapter 11 of the book referenced below, and also some details in semidirect product in ncatlab.

Abelian categories 
Non-trivial semidirect products do not arise in abelian categories, such as the category of modules. In this case, the splitting lemma shows that every semidirect product is a direct product. Thus the existence of semidirect products reflects a failure of the category to be abelian.

Notation 

However, some sources may use this symbol with the opposite meaning. In case the action  should be made explicit, one also writes . One way of thinking about the  symbol is as a combination of the symbol for normal subgroup and the symbol for the product. Barry Simon, in his book on group representation theory, employs the unusual notation  for the semidirect product.

Unicode lists four variants:

{| class="wikitable"
!   !! Value  !! MathML !! Unicode description
|-
| ⋉ || U+22C9 || ltimes || LEFT NORMAL FACTOR SEMIDIRECT PRODUCT
|-
| ⋊ || U+22CA || rtimes || RIGHT NORMAL FACTOR SEMIDIRECT PRODUCT
|-
| ⋋ || U+22CB || lthree || LEFT SEMIDIRECT PRODUCT
|-
| ⋌ || U+22CC || rthree || RIGHT SEMIDIRECT PRODUCT
|}

Here the Unicode description of the rtimes symbol says "right normal factor", in contrast to its usual meaning in mathematical practice.

In LaTeX, the commands \rtimes and \ltimes produce the corresponding characters. With the AMS symbols package loaded, \leftthreetimes produces ⋋ and \rightthreetimes produces ⋌.

See also 
Affine Lie algebra
Grothendieck construction, a categorical construction that generalizes the semidirect product
Holomorph
Lie algebra semidirect sum
Subdirect product
Wreath product
Zappa–Szép product
Crossed product

Notes

References

 R. Brown, Topology and groupoids, Booksurge 2006. 

Group products